Russian-Armenian University Business School (RAU Business school), founded in 2008, is the graduate business school of Russian-Armenian (Slavonic) University in Yerevan, Armenia. The school offers a variety of educational programs like MBA programs  and many Professional Courses.

In 2016 RAU Business school entered the international ranking list of Eduniversal of the best business schools in the world.

History

RAU Business School was formally established as a separate unit in 2008. Business School is a dynamically evolving, licensed educational institution in the field of business education, was a member of the Central and East European Management Development Association (CEEMAN), which employ modern approach to the methodology and quality in business education.
The Business School offers academic postgraduate as well as professional business training and development programs. BS provides innovation-oriented business education and adheres to the best international standards in business education. The professors and teaching staff of the Business School are local and regional experts in their respective fields with both theoretical and practical knowledge and experience.
During last three years Business School has established partner relations with several esteemed and world known institutions such as: University of Glasgow (Scotland); SBS Swiss Business School (Switzerland); Stockholm School of Economy (Riga branch); ISET (Georgia); Central European University (Slovakia); International University (Vienna); and many others in Kazakhstan, Ukraine, and more than 40 biggest universities in Russia.

Business School of the Russian-Armenian University entered the international ranking list of Best Business Schools among 1000 institutions in 154 countries according to the independent global ranking agency Eduniversal.
The 2016 rankings results were announced during the 9th International Convention held on November 28 - December 1 in Perth, Australia.
RAU Business School was awarded 2 Palmes of Excellence out of the 5 leagues. The School mapped its way to success due to its strong regional influence and significant international ties.

Mission of Business School

	Implementation of the best international methods and standards in the field of business education in Armenia.
	Comprehensive promotion of international standards in the field of professional training, retraining and increase qualification of local managerial staff.
	Raising the level of existing in Armenia standards in business education and correspond them to the higher international standards.

Purpose of Business School

Formation and development of an effective system of business education in Armenia, which will be much more correspond to the local market needs and would be able to provide best professional trainings, retraining and qualification improvement of managerial staff.

Programs

RAU Business School offers a variety of educational programs.

Master of Business Administration (MBA) Programs

	MBA RAU (in English)
	MBA RAU (in russian or armenian) 
	MBA Entrepreneurship (Swiss Business School)
	MBA Euromanagement (Graduate School of Corporate Management)

Professional Courses

Basics of Investment and Capital Markets
Business law
Business Process Management
Communication and Negotiation Skills
Crisis Management
Customer Relationship Management
Economics for Business
Financial Management
Financial Markets and Institutions
General Accounting
Human Resources Management
Leadership
Marketing Management
Marketing of the 21st Century
Megaeconomics
Project Management
Preparation to the PMP® and CAPM® certification exams
Public Relations
Quality Assurance Management
Risk Management
Statistical Analysis
Strategic Management
Taxation

See also
 Russian-Armenian (Slavonic) University
 SBS Swiss Business School
 Graduate School of Corporate Management

References

External links
 Official website of RAU Business School
 Official website RAU
 Official website Institute of Economics and Business at the RAU 

Russian-Armenian University
Business schools in Europe
2008 establishments in Armenia
Educational institutions established in 2008